The 2019 Mercedes-Benz UCI Mountain Bike World Cup was a series of races in Olympic Cross-Country (XCO), Cross-Country Eliminator (XCE), and Downhill (DHI). Each discipline had an Elite Men and an Elite Women category. There were also under-23 categories in the XCO and junior categories in the DHI. The cross-country series and the downhill series each had seven rounds, some of which are held concurrently.

Cross-country

Elite

Under 23

Downhill

Elite

Junior

World Cup standings
bold denotes race winners.

Cross-country

Men's

Women's

Downhill

Men's

Women's

See also
2019 UCI Mountain Bike World Championships

References

External links
2019 UCI Mountain Bike World Cup

UCI Mountain Bike World Cup
Mountain Bike World Cup